Business English is a part of English for specific purposes and can be considered a specialism within English language learning and teaching, or a variant of international English. Many non-native English speakers study the subject with the goal of doing business with English-speaking countries, or with companies located outside the English-speaking world but which nonetheless use English as a shared language or lingua franca. Much of the English communication that takes place within business circles all over the world occurs between non-native speakers. In cases such as these, the object of the exercise is efficient and effective communication. The strict rules of grammar are in such cases sometimes ignored, when, for example, a stressed negotiator's only goal is to reach an agreement as quickly as possible. (See linguist Braj Kachru's theory of the "expanding circle".)

Business English means different things to different people. For some, it focuses on vocabulary and topics used in the worlds of business, trade, finance, and international relations. For others it refers to the communication skills used in the workplace, and focuses on the language and skills needed for typical business communication such as presentations, negotiations, meetings, small talk, socializing, correspondence, report writing, and a systematic approach. In both of these cases it can be taught to native speakers of English, for example, high school students preparing to enter the job market. One can also study it at a college or university. Institutes around the world have courses or modules in BE available, which can lead to a degree in the subject.

See also
 International Association of Teachers of English as a Foreign Language

References

External links

Professional English Online from Cambridge University Press
Business English case studies
Online Journal on English for Specific Purposes
English for Business Courses
How to Write Briefing Notes and Briefing Books
Business English Writing: The Golden Standard

English-language education
English
English as a global language